Kumor is a Polish surname. Notable people with this surname include:

 Emil Kumor (1899–1957), Polish Army officer
 Konrad Kumor (born 2000), Polish footballer

See also
 
 Komor (surname)
 Komar (surname)

Polish-language surnames